Malik Iftikhar Ahmed is a Pakistani politician who was a Member of the Provincial Assembly of the Punjab, from 2008 to May 2018.

Early life and education
He was born on 15 May 1972 in Islamabad.

He has completed intermediate level education.

Political career

He was elected to the Provincial Assembly of the Punjab as a candidate of Pakistan Muslim League (N) (PML-N) from Constituency PP-10 (Rawalpindi-X) in a by-poll held in August 2008. He received 18,322 votes and defeated an independent candidate, Malik Mehboob Elahi.

He was elected to the Provincial Assembly of the Punjab as a candidate of PML-N from Constituency PP-10 (Rawalpindi-X) in 2013 Pakistani general election. He received 42,539 votes and defeated Umer Tanveer, a candidate of Pakistan Tehreek-e-Insaf (PTI).

References

Living people
Punjab MPAs 2013–2018
1972 births
Pakistan Muslim League (N) politicians
Punjab MPAs 2008–2013